John Fury is an Irish boxing cornerman and former professional boxer and bare-knuckle fighter. He is best known for  being the father of two-time heavyweight boxing world champion Tyson Fury, as well as professional boxer Tommy Fury. He is also uncle to heavyweight boxer Hughie Fury.

Background

Fury was born in Tuam, Galway, Ireland into a family of Irish Traveller heritage. He moved to Manchester, England at the age of 4 due to his father not being able to find work in his native Ireland. Fury claims descent from a long line of bare-knuckle fighters.

Boxing career

Fury's professional boxing career spanned eight years, beginning in April 1987 and ending in June 1995. In total, he was involved in 13 bouts.

He made his professional debut on 28 April 1987 when he lost to rugby league player Adam Fogerty in Halifax, West Yorkshire. From there Fury went on to win his next six fights until a draw with David Hopkins in Helsinki on 13 February 1989.

He was rewarded by a shot at the vacant Central Area title against Neil Malpass but lost on points.

After that he rebounded with wins against Michael Murray, a future British title challenger and Cesare Di Benedetto, a future Italian title challenger.

However in his next fight Fury suffered a KO loss against future WBO champion Henry Akinwande.

This loss was followed by a four year absence from the ring until Fury returned against former opponent Steve Garber in Manchester in 1995; he was knocked out again inside four rounds.

Fury finished his career with the record of 8–4–1.

Public image
Fury has been involved in many high-profile situations whilst supporting his son Tyson. After Tyson Fury defeated reigning 11-year champion Wladimir Klitschko in Düsseldorf on 27 November 2015, John Fury criticised the media for their lack of faith, exhorted them to "stop being yes men" then ordered everybody in the room to give his son a standing ovation for his achievement.

In the build-up to Tyson's rematch with Deontay Wilder, Fury was involved in a heated dispute with former heavyweight boxer David Haye over his son's chances before the fight. Fury stated that Wilder would 'crack' given that Tyson was no longer "as weak as a kitten" unlike in their previous controversial draw. He told BT Sport, "A man when he's pressured and he's in a hard time, he'll crack at the seams", before offering Haye a £1,000,000 bet on whether he would be proven correct, which he was. Fury's verbal tirades often verge on the obscene when, for example, he publicly belittled Deontay Wilder stating that he "is not fit to carry Anthony Joshua's jockstrap".

More recently, Fury appeared in the ITV documentary series Tyson Fury: The Gypsy King detailing the road to his son's rematch with Wilder. Fury appears many times but most notably in one of the final scenes showing his live reaction to the fight as he watched on a television at the BT Studios.

In March 2022, John Fury was confirmed as a brand ambassador for the sports betting website, Freebets.com.

Criminal conviction

In 2011, Fury was found guilty of wounding with intent to cause grievous bodily harm for gouging a man's eye out in a brawl in 2010. He was handed an 11-year sentence. The victim was left half-blind after a 12-year dispute erupted in violence at a car auction in 2010, with Fury getting the victim in a headlock and forcing his fingers into the victim's eyes. He was released from prison in February 2015.

Media appearances

Fury has appeared on many British television broadcasts, including live shows, pre-recorded programmes and documentaries.

Professional boxing record

References

Date of birth missing (living people)
Year of birth missing (living people)
Living people
Irish male boxers
People from Tuam
Fury family